Xerez Club Deportivo "B" was the reserve team of Xerez CD, a Spanish football club based in Jerez de la Frontera, in the autonomous community of Andalusia. Founded in 1957, it played its last season in Segunda Andaluza, holding home games at Estadio Municipal de Chapín.

Season to season
As Xerez Balompié CF

As Xerez CD "B"

3 seasons in Tercera División

External links
Xerez CD official website 
Futbol Regional Español profile 

1957 establishments in Spain
2015 disestablishments in Andalusia
Association football clubs established in 1957
Association football clubs disestablished in 2015
Defunct football clubs in Andalusia
Divisiones Regionales de Fútbol clubs
Spanish reserve football teams
Xerez CD